Rainthorpe Hall is a Grade I listed Elizabethan country mansion near Tasburgh in Norfolk, England, about  south of Norwich. It is notable for its medieval stonework, wood carvings, rare 17th-century leather wall-coverings and 19th-century Victorian mirrors. The hall's grounds extend to 18.7 acres.

There is evidence that the Hall dates back to the 15th century or earlier in some form and that most of the original structure was destroyed by a fire around 1500. In 1579, the lawyer Thomas Baxter purchased the property and set about adding to it and altering it to include two new wings, before selling the property in 1628. The next owner of note was Frederick Walpole, youngest son of Horatio Walpole, 3rd Earl of Orford, who purchased the property in 1852; his influence on the house can be seen in the hall chimney, stone windows and stained glass.

Colonel Sir Charles Harvey, who later became the 2nd Baronet Harvey of Crown Point, Trowse, Norfolk, bought Rainthorpe Hall in 1878, and the following year constructed the stable block and the castellated gardener's cottage which sits to the right of the property. Harvey added the five bay window extension at the front in 1885.

After this, Rainthorpe Hall was purchased by the economist J Maurice Hastings, who, according to his good friend, Maurice Bowra, held "wild parties" at the Hall. The Hall was subsequently inherited by his son, George Hastings, who sold it to the barrister and businessman Alastair Wilson QC in 1990.

References 

Grade I listed buildings in Norfolk
Country houses in Norfolk
Grade I listed houses
Elizabethan architecture